The discography of the Japanese singer/actress Miho Nakayama consists of 22 studio albums, 17 compilation albums, and 39 singles released since 1985.

Albums

Studio albums

Live albums

Compilations

Box sets

Remix albums

Singles

Regular singles

Digital-only singles

Videography

Music video and image albums

Live video albums

Video box sets

Video games

See also 
 List of best-selling music artists in Japan

Footnotes

References

External links 
 

Discographies of Japanese artists
Pop music discographies